The 2014–15 Northwestern Wildcats men's basketball team represented Northwestern University in the 2014–15 college basketball season. Led by second year head coach Chris Collins. The Wildcats were members of the Big Ten Conference and played their home games at Welsh-Ryan Arena. They finished the season 15–17, 6–12 in Big Ten play to finish in a tie for tenth place. They lost in the second round of the Big Ten tournament to Indiana.

Previous season
The Wildcats finished the season 14–19, 6–12 in Big Ten play to finish in a tie for tenth place. They advanced to the quarterfinals of the Big Ten tournament where they lost to Michigan State.

Departures

Incoming transfers

Incoming recruits

Class of 2014 recruits

Class of 2015 recruits

Roster

Schedule and results
Source

|-
!colspan=9 style="background:#431F81; color:#FFFFFF;"| Exhibition

|-
!colspan=9 style="background:#431F81; color:#FFFFFF;"| Non-conference regular season

|-
!colspan=9 style="background:#431F81; color:#FFFFFF;"| Big Ten regular season

|-
!colspan=9 style="background:#431F81; color:#FFFFFF;"| Big Ten tournament

References

Northwestern Wildcats
Northwestern Wildcats men's basketball seasons
Northwestern Wild
Northwestern Wild